The 2013 NCAA Division I FCS football season, part of college football in the United States, was organized by the National Collegiate Athletic Association (NCAA) at the Division I Football Championship Subdivision (FCS) level. The season began on August 29, 2013, and concluded with the 2014 NCAA Division I Football Championship Game on January 4, 2014, at Toyota Stadium in Frisco, Texas.

Notable changes
For 2013, the FCS playoffs expanded for the first time since 2010. The Pioneer Football League champion now receives an automatic bid into the FCS playoffs, which increased to 24 teams.

Under a standard provision of NCAA rules, all FCS programs were allowed to play 12 regular-season games (not counting conference title games) in 2013, and also in 2014. In years when the period starting with the Thursday before Labor Day and ending with the final Saturday in November contains 14 Saturdays, FCS programs may play 12 games instead of the regular 11. After 2014, the next season in which 12-game seasons are allowed will be 2019.

Conference changes and new programs

Several teams changed conferences from the 2012 season, with all moves officially taking effect on July 1, 2013.

Albany and Stony Brook became football-only members of the Colonial Athletic Association (CAA). Previously, they had respectively been football-only members of the Northeast Conference and Big South Conference.

Georgia State left the FCS ranks to become a member of the Sun Belt Conference. As it began its FBS transition in 2012, it was counted as an FBS member for scheduling purposes in 2013.

Old Dominion joined Conference USA (C-USA) and started its FBS transition. ODU was technically an FCS independent in 2013 before becoming a provisional FBS member in 2014 and a full FBS member in 2015.

The Southland Conference added four schools—two with established football programs, one launching a new program, and another (New Orleans) without varsity football. The established programs were Abilene Christian and Incarnate Word, both joining from the Division II Lone Star Conference. While technically considered FCS independents in 2013, they played Division II schedules this season. Both would be counted as FCS members for scheduling purposes in 2014, at which time they began playing full Southland Conference schedules. Houston Baptist, arriving from the Division I Great West Conference, fielded a football team for the first time in 2013, but only played a partial schedule. Houston Baptist also began playing a full Southland schedule in 2014.

Monmouth announced in December 2012 that it would leave the Northeast Conference (NEC) for the Metro Atlantic Athletic Conference (MAAC), effective in July 2013. As the MAAC has not sponsored football since 2007, Monmouth's football plans were uncertain. Those plans became clear on February 14, 2013, when the Big South Conference announced that Monmouth would become a football-only member of that league in 2014. Since Monmouth was transitioning from the limited-scholarship NEC to a conference that allows the full FCS limit of 63 scholarship equivalents, the Hawks played the 2013 football season as an independent.

In addition to the schools changing conferences, three others launched FCS football programs. Charlotte, which rejoined C-USA after eight years in the Atlantic 10 Conference, played as an FCS independent in its first football season, as part of its announced plan to become a full FBS member in 2015. The 49ers were counted as an FBS program for scheduling purposes in 2014 and became a C-USA football member in 2015. Two other schools, Mercer and Stetson, reinstated varsity football after decades-long absences—Mercer had last played in 1941 and Stetson in 1956. Both initially planned to operate as non-scholarship programs in the Pioneer Football League. However, Mercer would later commit to scholarship football when it accepted an invitation to join the Southern Conference (SoCon) in 2014.

Two other SoCon members, Appalachian State and Georgia Southern, were officially announced on March 27, 2013 as future Sun Belt members. Both schools began FBS transitions in 2013 in advance of their 2014 entry into the Sun Belt. They were counted as FBS members for scheduling purposes in 2014, and were eligible for the Sun Belt football championship, but were not eligible for bowl games until completing their transitions in 2015.

This was also the last season for two other programs in their then-current conferences. Elon left the SoCon for the CAA in July 2014; at the same time, VMI left the Big South and returned to the SoCon after an 11-year absence.

New, expanded, renovated, and temporary stadiums

New stadiums
 Albany made its CAA debut in Bob Ford Field, a new 8,500-seat on-campus stadium. University Field, which Albany had used for both football and track since 1970, is now solely a track venue.
 Charlotte made its football debut in Jerry Richardson Stadium, a new on-campus facility. Its initial capacity is 15,300, but it can be expanded to 25,000 with temporary seating. The stadium design allows future expansion to 40,000.
 Mercer plays at the Moye Complex, a new on-campus venue with a capacity of 10,200.
 Stetson plays at the already-existing Spec Martin Stadium, an off-campus stadium owned by Stetson's home city of DeLand, Florida. The stadium holds 6,000.

Expanded stadiums

Renovated stadiums

Temporary stadiums

FCS team wins over FBS teams

(FCS rankings from the Sports Network poll; FBS rankings from the AP Poll)

 August 29:
 Southern Utah 22, South Alabama 21
 No. 11 Towson 33, Connecticut 18
 August 30:
 No. 1 North Dakota State 24, Kansas State 21
 Samford 31, Georgia State 21
 August 31:
 No. 21 Eastern Illinois 40, San Diego State 19
 No. 4 Eastern Washington 49, No. 25 Oregon State 46 (this is the third time an FCS team has beat an FBS team that was ranked in the AP poll, after James Madison's victory over No. 13 Virginia Tech in 2010 and Appalachian State's upset of No. 5 Michigan in 2007).
 McNeese State 53, South Florida 21
 No. 17 Northern Iowa 28, Iowa State 20
 September 7:
 Chattanooga 42, Georgia State 14
 Maine 24, Massachusetts 14
 Nicholls State 27, Western Michigan 23
 September 14:
 No. 23 Bethune-Cookman 34, Florida International 13
 Fordham 30, Temple 29
 September 21:
 Jacksonville State 32, Georgia State 26 OT
 November 9:
Old Dominion 59, Idaho 38
 November 23:
 Georgia Southern 26, Florida 20

Conference standings

Conference summaries

Championship games

Other conference winners

Note: Records are regular-season only, and do not include playoff games.

Playoff qualifiers

Automatic berths for conference champions
Big Sky Conference – Eastern Washington 
Big South Conference – Coastal Carolina
Colonial Athletic Association – Maine
Mid-Eastern Athletic Conference – Bethune-Cookman
Missouri Valley Football Conference – North Dakota State 
Northeast Conference – Sacred Heart
Ohio Valley Conference – Eastern Illinois
Patriot League – Lafayette
Pioneer Football League - Butler
Southern Conference – Furman
Southland Conference – Southeastern Louisiana

At large qualifiers
Big Sky Conference - Montana, Northern Arizona, Southern Utah
Big South Conference - None
Colonial Athletic Association - New Hampshire, Towson
Mid-Eastern Athletic Conference - South Carolina State
Missouri Valley Football Conference - South Dakota State
Northeast Conference - None
Ohio Valley Conference - Jacksonville State, Tennessee State
Patriot League - Fordham
Pioneer Football League - None
Southern Conference - Samford
Southland Conference - McNeese State, Sam Houston State

Abstentions
Ivy League – Princeton
Southwestern Athletic Conference – Southern

Postseason
After three seasons with a playoff field of twenty teams, the FCS bracket was expanded to 24 this postseason, with the eight seeded teams receiving first-round byes.

NCAA Division I playoff bracket

*

Coaching changes

Preseason and in-season
This is restricted to coaching changes that took place on or after May 1, 2013. For coaching changes that occurred earlier in 2013, see 2012 NCAA Division I FCS end-of-season coaching changes.

End of season

NFL draft selections

Listed below are all FCS players selected in the 2014 NFL Draft

See also

 2013 NCAA Division I FCS football rankings

References